Ferreira Pinto may refer to:
Ferreira Pinto (footballer, born 1939), Portuguese footballer
Ferreira Pinto (footballer, born 1979), Brazilian footballer